James L. Mooney, Jr. (September 16, 1907August 12, 1944) was an American football player in the National Football League for the Newark Tornadoes, Brooklyn Dodgers, Cincinnati Reds, St. Louis Gunners and Chicago Cardinals. Prior to his professional career, Mooney played college football at Georgetown University. In high school, he was a star halfback at Loyola Academy.

After the end of his NFL career, Mooney became a patrolman for the Chicago Police Department, for whom his father worked as a detective, at the Hudson avenue station. He returned to football in 1940 as a coach for the Chicago Gunners; he had also coached the New York Yankees of the American Football League in 1937, which included briefly playing in a game that year against the Rochester Tigers before fracturing his left ankle. Mooney also worked as security for the Chicago College All-Star Game.

He reached the rank of corporal while serving in the United States Army during World War II, and was killed in action on August 12, 1944, when he was shot by a sniper in France. His last assignment was with the 110th Infantry Regiment of the 28th Infantry Division. He is buried in Plot D, Row 12, Grave 9 of the Brittany American Cemetery and Memorial.

References

External links
Profile at pro-football-reference.com
The National Football League's World War II Casualties
Georgetown All-Americans

1907 births
1944 deaths
Players of American football from Chicago
Georgetown University alumni
Georgetown Hoyas football players
Newark Tornadoes players
Brooklyn Dodgers (NFL) players
Cincinnati Reds (NFL) players
St. Louis Gunners players
Chicago Cardinals players
United States Army personnel killed in World War II
Deaths by firearm in France
Chicago Police Department officers
United States Army non-commissioned officers